Fast Track Love (simplified Chinese: 车神; traditional Chinese: 車神; lit. God of Race Car) is a Chinese drama television series co-produced by mainland China and Taiwan. This is the first car-race series in mainland China. Zhao Wei and Lu Yi was a screen couple in A Time to Love. It was shown on television in the following countries and regions: mainland China, Taiwan, Hong Kong, Macau, Malaysia, Vietnam,  Thailand and Philippines.

Cast
Chen Xiaoxiao, played by Zhao Wei
Zhang Jiaxiang, played by Lu Yi
Ouyang Qian, played by An Yixuan
Huo Juncong, played by Lee Wai
Liu Yunsong, played by Qiao Zhenyu

International broadcast

Soundtrack
mainland Edition:
 Ending Theme Song: Don't Let Me Go (Chinese Title: 不要把我的手放开) performed by Zhao Wei

Taiwan Edition:
 Opening Theme Song: White Hair (Chinese Title: 白頭鬃) performed by Zeng Xinmei
 Ending Theme Song: The Secret (Chinese Title: 不能講的秘密) performed by Weng Panfei

References

External links
Official Site (mainland China)
FTV Official Site (Taiwan)

2006 Chinese television series debuts
2006 Chinese television series endings
Television shows set in China
Mandarin-language television shows
Chinese romance television series
Chinese sports television series

ko:한국어